David Mellor (born 1949) is a British former politician, broadcaster and football pundit.

David Mellor may also refer to:

David Mellor (designer) (1930–2009), British  designer
David Mellor (footballer) (born 1993), British footballer for Oldham Athletic
David Alan Mellor, British curator and professor of and writer on art
David Paver Mellor (1903–1980), Australian inorganic chemist
David Hugh Mellor (1938–2020), English philosopher